Mostafa Tarek Meshaal (born 28 March 2001) is a Qatari professional footballer who plays as a midfielder for Qatari club Al Sadd SC and the Qatar national football team.

References

External links

Qatari footballers
2001 births
Living people
Al Sadd SC players
Qatar Stars League players
Place of birth missing (living people)
2022 FIFA World Cup players